John M. Michael is a former American state legislator. Michael was born in Lewiston, Maine and represented a portion of Auburn in the Maine House of Representatives from 1978–1986, 1990–1994 and 2000–2002.

In 1994, he ran for US Congress as an Independent and received 8.8% of the vote. In 2002, Michael ran as an independent candidate for governor of Maine. He unsuccessfully sought clean elections funds and received 2.1% of the vote. 

Michael ran again for governor in 2006, but withdrew in August because he again failed to qualify for "Clean Election" candidate funds. Included in his platform was an anti-gambling plank.

He also led several citizen initiatives, including two regarding term-limits for elected officials and the 2000 repeal of the "snack tax".

In 2018, Michael was elected to represent part of Auburn on the Androscoggin County Commission.

References

Year of birth missing (living people)
Living people
Maine Democrats
Maine Independents
Politicians from Lewiston, Maine
Members of the Maine House of Representatives
Politicians from Auburn, Maine